Les Assions is a commune in the Ardèche department in the Auvergne-Rhône-Alpes region of southern France.

The inhabitants of the commune are known as Assionais or Assionaises.

Geography

Les Assions is located some 35 km south-west of Aubenas and 5 km north-east of Les Vans. Access to the commune is by the D104A road from Lablachère in the north passing through the heart of the commune just east of the village and continuing south to join the D295 near Vompdes. The D452 branches off the D104A in the commune and goes east by a circuitous route to the Village de Vacances Francaises de Casteljau. The D104 from Lablachère to Saint-Paul-le-Jeune forms the eastern border of the commune. Access to the village is by a country road (Le Village) branching north from the D104A in the south of the commune. Apart from the village there are the hamlets of Le Bosc in the west, Le Bourel and La Ribeyrie to the north-east and Champetier-Haut in the north. The commune east of the Salindres river is mostly wasteland and forest while the west side is mostly forest with farmland and residential areas.

The Chassezac river forms the southern border of the commune as it flows east to join the Ardeche at Saint-Alban-Auriolles. The Riviere de Salindres flows south through the commune to join the Chassezac and several other tributaries rise in the commune and flow into the Chassezac.

The vegetation includes predominantly oak trees, olive trees and chestnut trees.

Neighbouring communes and villages

Administration

List of Successive Mayors

Demography
In 2017 the commune had 740 inhabitants.

Distribution of Age Groups
The population of the town is relatively old.

Percentage Distribution of Age Groups in Les Assions and Ardèche Department in 2017

Source: INSEE

Sites and monuments
The abandoned village of Cornilhon
The Clochans on the Plateau des Gras
The Chapel of Sainte-Apollonie from the 19th century on top of the Puech
The Church of Saint-Apollinaire, rebuilt in the 17th and 19th centuries on the ruins of a Roman church

The Church of Saint-Apollinaire contains three items that are registered as historical objects:
Statue: Saint Apollinaire (19th century)
2 Processional Crosses (19th century)
A Bronze Bell (1670)

Gallery

See also
Communes of the Ardèche department

References

External links

Les Assions on Géoportail, National Geographic Institute (IGN) website 
Aßion on the 1750 Cassini Map

Communes of Ardèche